This article lists the provinces of South Africa by their average total fertility rate per woman according to data by Statistics South Africa.

References 

Fertility rate
South African provinces by fertility rate
Fertility